The governors of the Australian states, who represent their respective head of state (the King of Australia), have a personal flag in that role. With the exception of Queensland's, the current design of these flags originate from the 1970s and 1980s.

History 
The governors of British colonies have historically used as their personal flag the Union Flag defaced in the centre with a local badge or coat of arms to represent their status as vice-regal representative in that colony. In the then Australasian colonies, the governors used the colonial badge encircled in a laurel wreath. After federation, when the Australian colonies became states of the Commonwealth of Australia, the governors continued using their earlier flags.

During the 1970s and 80s, the states, with the exception of Queensland, moved away from the British colonial model. This was in line with the constitutional developments of the time, which culminated in the Australia Act 1986, which ended the states' constitutional status as individual colonies of the United Kingdom. Since the passing of the Act, the governors of the Australian states have ceased to have any constitutional relationship with the government of the United Kingdom, and represent the monarch in his or her capacity of sovereign of each of the individual states.

Standards 
The state governors’ flags of most states is the same as the state's flag but with a graphical representation of St Edward's crown above the badge. The flags of Victoria and Queensland already contain a crown, and so these states use different models: the Governor of Victoria's flag uses a gold ensign with the stars of the Southern Cross in red, whereas the Governor of Queensland's flag maintains the old defaced Union Jack.

See also

List of Australian flags
Flag of the Governor-General of Australia
King's Personal Australian Flag

External links 
State Governors' Flags at Flags of the World

Governors